Rothko can refer to:

Mark Rothko (1903-1970), American painter
Rothko (band), a London-based instrumental ambient band
Rothko (club), a New York music venue opened in 2004 and closed in 2006